Nicocles (ruled 251 BC) was a tyrant of the ancient Greek city-state of Sicyon in the 3rd century BC; to which position he raised himself in 251 BC by the murder of Paseas, who had succeeded his son Abantidas in the sovereign power. He had reigned only four months, during which period he had already driven into exile eighty of the citizens, when the citadel of Sicyon (which had narrowly escaped falling into the hands of the Aetolians shortly before) was surprised in the night by a party of Sicyonian exiles, headed by young Aratus. The palace of the tyrant was set on fire, but Nicocles himself made his escape by a subterranean passage, and fled from the city. Of his subsequent fortunes nothing is known.

Notes

References
Smith, William (ed.); Dictionary of Greek and Roman Biography and Mythology, "Nicocles (5)", Boston, (1867)

Ancient Greek tyrants
Ancient Greek rulers
Ancient Sicyonians
3rd-century BC Greek people